Suar is a city and a municipal board in Rampur district in the Indian state of Uttar Pradesh.

Geography
It has an average elevation of 214 metres (702 feet).

Demographics
, Suar had a population of 26,142. Males constitute 53% of the population and females 47%. Suar has an average literacy rate of 28%, lower than the national average of 59.5%: male literacy is 34%, and female literacy is 20%. In Suar, 19% of the population is under 6 years of age.

References

Cities and towns in Rampur district